This is a list of the squads that qualified for the 2014 Champions League Twenty20.

Note: Players with international caps are listed in bold.

Barbados Tridents
Coach:  Vasbert Drakes

Cape Cobras 
Coach:  Paul Adams

Chennai Super Kings 
Coach:  Stephen Fleming

Dolphins 
Coach:  Lance Klusener

Hobart Hurricanes 
Coach:  Damien Wright

Kings XI Punjab 
Coach:  Sanjay Bangar

Kolkata Knight Riders 
Coach:  Trevor Bayliss

Lahore Lions 
Coach:  Mohsin Kamal

Mumbai Indians 
Coach:  John Wright

Northern Districts 
Coach:  James Pamment

Perth Scorchers 
Coach:  Justin Langer

Southern Express T20 
Coach:  Upul Chandana

References

External links
2014 Champions League Twenty20 squads on ESPN Cricinfo

Champions League Twenty20 squads